Grand Theatre, Poznań  (Polish: Teatr Wielki im. Stanisława Moniuszki w Poznaniu) is a neoclassical opera house located in Poznań, Poland. It is named after famous Polish composer Stanisław Moniuszko.

History
Designed by German architect Max Littmann, and inaugurated in 1910 with The Magic Flute (Wolfgang Amadeus Mozart), the Grand Theatre in Poznań is a main opera stage in Greater Poland Voivodeship currently directed by Michał Znaniecki.

Its season runs from mid-September to mid-June and the company mounts an annual "Festival Verdi" in October and "E. T. A. Hoffmann Festival" in April, often with special guests.

References
 Homepage (Polish, English, German)

Theatres in Poznań
Opera houses in Poland
Music venues completed in 1910
1910 establishments in Germany
1910 establishments in Poland
Theatres completed in 1910